Laura Volkerding (1939–1996) was an American photographer.

Education
Volkerding received a BFA degree from the University of Louisville in 1961 and an MA degree in graphic design from the Institute of Design in Chicago in 1964.

Career
Her photographic career began in the 1960s, working first in 35mm format and then transitioning to larger formats. In the late 1970s he took medium format black and white photographs of inhabited landscapes, such as campgrounds, as well as panoramic photographs that ranged from diptychs to eight-part images. She is known for her photographs of the Compagnons du Devoir, master a group of French master artisans known for restoring historical monuments.

Volkerding also taught at Rosary College and at the University of Chicago. Her last teaching position was at Stanford University in Palo Alto, California. She died as a result of a malignant brain tumor in 1996.

Collections
Her work is included in the collections of the Smithsonian American Art Museum,
the Metropolitan Museum of Art, the Art Institute of Chicago, the Cantor Arts Center at Stanford University, the Museum of Contemporary Photography, the Center for Creative Photography and the Museum of Modern Art, New York.

References

1939 births
1996 deaths
University of Louisville alumni
20th-century American women artists
20th-century American photographers